Sanjay Kumar Seth (10 June 1957 – 30 April 2021) was an Indian Judge and former Chief Justice of Madhya Pradesh High Court.

Career
After passing B.A., LL.B., Seth was enrolled as an Advocate on 24 July 1981 and practised in Jabalpur on Civil and Constitutional matters. He served as an additional advocate general in the Madhya Pradesh High Court for the Government of Madhya Pradesh. Seth was appointed an additional Judge of Madhya Pradesh High Court on 21 March 2003 and was appointed Permanent Judge on 19 January 2004. He became the Acting Chief Justice of the Madhya Pradesh High Court after Justice Hemant Gupta's appointment in Supreme Court of India. Justice Seth was appointed the Chief Justice of the same High Court on 14 November 2018.

Death
Justice Seth died from COVID-19 on 30 April 2021.

References

1957 births
2021 deaths
Indian judges
Chief Justices of the Madhya Pradesh High Court
Judges of the Madhya Pradesh High Court
People from Madhya Pradesh
20th-century Indian judges
21st-century Indian judges
People from Jabalpur
Deaths from the COVID-19 pandemic in India